George Washington Jones (September 5, 1828 – July 11, 1903) was an American politician who served as lieutenant governor of Texas and was a Greenback member of the United States House of Representatives.

Early life
George Washington Jones was born to William Dandridge Claiborne Jones and Rachel Burleson Jones on September 5, 1828, in Marion County, Alabama.  He moved with his parents to Tipton County, Tennessee, and then to Bastrop, Texas.  Jones studied law, was admitted to the bar in 1851, and commenced practice in Bastrop. He owned slaves.

From 1858 until 1860, he served as Bastrop county attorney.

Military service
Although a supporter of the Union, Jones served in the Confederate States Army, eventually attaining the rank of colonel as commander of the 17th Texas Infantry Regiment.

Public service
He was a delegate to the Texas state constitutional convention in 1866. Jones was elected lieutenant governor in 1866, with James W. Throckmorton as governor.  Both Jones and Throckmorton were removed from office in 1867 by General Philip Henry Sheridan for being obstructions to Reconstruction.

In 1878, Jones was elected as United States Congressman for the Texas 5th Congressional District.  He was reelected in 1880 and served from March 4, 1879, to March 3, 1883.

Personal life and death
On August 1, 1855, he married Ledora Ann Mullins in Bastrop.

Jones died on July 11, 1903. Ledora Jones died on August 31, 1903. They are both interred at Fairview Cemetery in Bastrop.

Notes

References

External links

1828 births
1903 deaths
People from Marion County, Alabama
Texas Democrats
Greenback Party members of the United States House of Representatives from Texas
Lieutenant Governors of Texas
Texas lawyers
American slave owners
People from Tipton County, Tennessee
People from Bastrop, Texas
Confederate States Army officers
People of Texas in the American Civil War